The junior women's downhill is an event at the annual UCI Mountain Bike World Championships. It is restricted to competitors who are under 19 years of age at the end of the calendar year. It has been held since the second world championships in the 1991 UCI Mountain Bike World Championships

Medalists

Medal table

References
UCI Mountain Bike World Championships - Junior women Dowhill - All podiums 1990-2015
2016 Junior women's downhill results

Events at the UCI Mountain Bike & Trials World Championships